Conus biancae, common name Bianca's cone, is a species of sea snail, a marine gastropod mollusc in the family Conidae, the cone snails and their allies.

Like all species within the genus Conus, these snails are predatory and venomous. They are capable of "stinging" humans, therefore live ones should be handled carefully or not at all.

Description
The length of the shell attains 40 mm.

Distribution
This marine species is found off Southern Madagascar.

References

 Bozzetti L. (2010) Conus biancae (Gastropoda: Prosobranchia: Conidae) a new species from Southern Madagascar. Malacologia Mostra Mondiale 66: 15–16

External links
 The Conus Biodiversity website
 
 Holotype at MNHN, Paris

biancae
Gastropods described in 2010